Askarov (Cyrillic: Аскаров, Azerbaijani: Əsgərov, Uzbek: Asqarov) is a central-Asian masculine surname, its feminine counterpart is Askarova. It may refer to
Alla Askarova (born 1954), Russian alpine skier
Almaz Askarov (footballer) (born 1992), Russian football midfielder
Almaz Askarov (wrestler) (born 1973), Kyrgyzstani wrestler
Azimzhan Askarov (1951–2020), Uzbek-Kyrgyzstani political activist 
Askar Askarov (born 1992), Russian mixed martial artist and freestyle wrestler 
Davron Askarov (born 1988), Kyrgyzstani football player
Erzhan Askarov (born 1985), Kyrgyzstani middle-distance runner
German Askarov (1882–1937?), Russian anarchist
Gochag Askarov (born 1978), Azerbaijani khananda folk singer and piano player
Yaroslav Askarov (born 2002), Russian ice hockey goaltender 

Azerbaijani-language surnames
Kyrgyz-language surnames